Bananagun are an Australian music group. They released their debut studio album in June 2020.

Band members
Current members
 Nick Van Bakel (multi-instrumentalist)
 Jimi Gregg (drums) 
 Jack Crook (guitar)
 Charlotte Tobin (djembe/percussion) 
 Joshua Dans (bass)

Career

2016–present: The True Story of Bananagun
Originally Nick Van Bakel's solo recording project, Bananagun's members have grown into a five-piece, born out of fellow psych-rockers The Frowning Clouds, also fronted by Van Bakel.

The band released their debut double-A sided single "Do Yeah"/"Top Cat" in February 2019.

In April 2020, the band announced the release of their debut studio album, The True Story of Bananagun for 26 June 2020. In July, the album debuted at number 40 on the ARIA Charts. While reviewing their debut album in the New Yorker, Jay Ruttenberg said that Bananagun "bears the hallmarks of one of the sundry sixties acts whose work slipped through the cracks of time, only to be salvaged, decades later, by sharp-eared record collectors."

Discography

Albums

Singles

References

External links
 
 

Australian musical groups
2016 establishments in Australia
Full Time Hobby artists
Anti Fade Records artists